Subsea 7 S.A. is a Luxembourgish-domiciled subsea engineering, construction and services company serving the offshore energy industry. The company is registered in Luxembourg with its headquarters in London.

History

The company was formed by the January 2011 combination of its two predecessor companies, Acergy S.A. and Subsea 7, Inc.

Acergy was founded in 1970 as Stolt Nielsen Seaway, a division of the Norwegian Stolt-Nielsen Group offering divers for the exploration of the North Sea. After a series of acquisitions, including Comex Services of France in 1992 and Houston, Texas-based Ceanic Corporation in 1998, the company changed its name to Stolt Offshore in 2000. Five years later Stolt-Nielsen spun out the company as an independent business listed on the Oslo Stock Exchange and NASDAQ. The firm renamed as Acergy in March 2006.

Subsea 7, Inc. was the result of a series of mergers between DSND Offshore AS, Halliburton Subsea, Subsea Offshore and Rockwater over an extended period, with Rockwater and SubSea merging in 1999 to form Halliburton Subsea, and the resulting company operating as a 50/50 joint venture with DSND in 2002 with the name Subsea 7. Halliburton exited the joint venture in November 2004. The company was listed on the Oslo Stock Exchange in August 2005 following its restructuring the same year.

On 21 June 2010 the combination of Acergy S.A. and Subsea 7 Inc. was announced and was completed on 7 January 2011. The new entity took the Subsea 7 name while retaining Acergy's Luxembourg domicile and operational headquarters in London. The chairman and chief executive roles were filled by Kristian Siem and Jean Cahuzac, who had previously held the same roles at Subsea 7 and Acergy respectively.

Offices
 
The current world headquarters for Subsea 7 are located at 40 Brighton Road, Sutton, London.

See also 
 List of oilfield service companies

References

External links

Engineering companies of Luxembourg
Engineering companies of the United Kingdom
Companies listed on the Oslo Stock Exchange
Companies formerly listed on the Nasdaq
Energy engineering and contractor companies
Offshore engineering
Oilfield services companies
Multinational companies headquartered in Luxembourg
Multinational companies based in the City of London